Andrew Harris and Nick Kyrgios were the defending champions. Kyrgios partnered up with Wayne Montgomery, but lost in the first round, while Harris decided not to participate.
Kyle Edmund and Frederico Ferreira Silva won the title, defeating Cristian Garín and Nicolás Jarry in the final, 6–3, 6–3.

Seeds

Draw

Finals

Top half

Bottom half

References 
 Main Draw

Boys' Doubles
2013